Loboplusia is a genus of moths of the family Noctuidae.

Species
 Loboplusia vanderweelei Roepke, 1941

References
 Loboplusia at funet.fi
 Natural History Museum Lepidoptera genus database

Plusiinae